Beyond the Fall of Time is the second studio album by American thrash metal band Exmortus. It was released on September 6, 2011 on Earache Records.

Track listing

References

External links
 Encyclopaedia Metallum
 Discogs

2008 albums
Exmortus albums
Earache Records albums